Saint Agnes is a neighborhood in the Southwest District of Baltimore, located between the neighborhoods of Irvington (north) and Violetville (south). Its boundaries are marked by Wilkens Avenue (south), Caton Avenue (east) and Loudon Park Cemetery (northwest). Saint Agnes Hospital is located on the opposite side (south) of Wilkens Avenue.

Public transportation
Route 35 (MTA Maryland) provides bus service along Wilkens Avenue, traveling between Franklin Square (east) and Arbutus (west).

See also
List of Baltimore neighborhoods

References

External links
 Southwest District Maps. Baltimore City Neighborhoods Portal.
 

Neighborhoods in Baltimore
Southwest Baltimore